Lasiognathus intermedius is a species of wolftrap angler known from the western Atlantic Ocean and the southeastern Pacific Ocean where it occurs at depths of around .  The females of this species grow to a length of  SL.  This species has an elongated, cylindrical distal appendage with a short, cylindrical prolongation at the tip without any lateral serrations or filaments. The posterior escal appendage is cylindrical in shape. Its species name refers to its esca being intermediate in shape between those of L. beebei and those of L. saccostoma and L. waltoni.

References
 

Thaumatichthyidae
Taxa named by Theodore Wells Pietsch III
Fish described in 1996
Taxa named by Erik Bertelsen